The San Bernardino County Transportation Authority (SBCTA) is the successor to San Bernardino Associated Governments (SANBAG or SanBAG). They are responsible for administering the Measure I half-cent tax which voters in San Bernardino County, California, passed most recently in 2004. The SBCTA conducts transportation planning, construction, and operation in San Bernardino County. The SBCTA is a joint powers authority comprising the entire county and its cities. Every city and county supervisor is provided one seat on the board, and it also includes a nonvoting member from the California Department of Transportation's (Caltrans) District 8.

Planning
The SBCTA conducts transportation planning for San Bernardino County, California, as well as aligning with plans from neighboring agencies.

Tollway projects

I-10 Express Lanes
The SBCTA and Caltrans completed the $929.2 million Phase 1 project to add tolled express lanes to Interstate 10 (I-10) from the Los Angeles County line to Interstate 15 (I-15). Under Phase 1, 18 bridges throughout the corridor will either be replaced or widened to accommodate the new toll lanes. It is expected to be completed by 2023.

I-15 Express Lanes
The SBCTA has planned to implement tolled express lanes to I-15 from the Riverside County line to Duncan Canyon Boulevard. Construction is expected to begin in 2023. The project is expected to cost $469.65 million.

Road projects

North First Avenue Bridge 
Due to automobile damage sustained to the North First Avenue Bridge in Barstow, the SBCTA took over the replacement of the bridge from the city due to its critical importance, since it passes over the BNSF Southern Transcon rail corridor and yard. The expected cost of the project is $62 million. Currently, it is in the design phase to replace the 1930's bridge.

Transit projects

West Valley Connector (BRT) 
The West Valley Connector is a  bus rapid transit project spearheaded by the SBCTA that will connect Pomona with Fontana. The first phase is a  segment that will run along Holt Boulevard to Ontario International Airport and Metrolink’s Rancho Cucamonga station. Phase 1 will have 21 stations along the route.

Tunnel to Ontario International Airport Project 
The Ontario Airport Loop was expected to cost around $75 million compared to the Foothill Extension at around $1.5 billion.

The current project planning is being developed by HNTB after The Boring Company dropped out due to their refusal to submit another refined proposal. The estimated costs are around $492 million under the current expanded proposal.

Metrolink San Bernardino Line Double Track Project (Lilac to Rancho) 
The SBCTA is in the process of double-tracking Metrolink's San Bernardino Line from CP Lilac to Rialto station to increase capacity and frequency within San Bernardino County.

Transit services

Bus
The SBCTA provides transit funding for all the bus transit agencies in San Bernardino County. It is also responsible for the oversight of Omnitrans, Victor Valley Transit Authority (VVTA), Needles Area Transit (NAT), Mountain Transit, and Basin Transit.

Passenger rail

Metrolink
San Bernardino County is served by and partially funds three of Metrolink's lines. This includes the San Bernardino Line, which has the highest ridership of the entire system, the Inland Empire–Orange County Line, which terminates at the San Bernardino Santa Fe Depot and San Bernardino–Downtown stations, and the Riverside Line, which serves Ontario–East station.

Arrow 

Arrow, formerly the Redlands Passenger Rail Project (RPRP or RPR), is a commuter rail line which runs from the San Bernardino Transit Center in Downtown San Bernardino in the west to the University of Redlands in Redlands in the east. Simulated service testing commenced on September 12, 2022. Service commenced on October 24, 2022.

Freeway Service Patrol
In order to reduce congestion, the SBCTA implemented the Freeway Service Patrol (FSP), whose purpose is to tow stranded motorist within the urbanized area of San Bernardino County. Service operates during peak traffic times.

Active transportation
The SBCTA maintains a countywide active transportation plan. Although San Bernardino County is vast, much of the population is concentrated in the San Bernardino Valley portion in the county's southwest corner. The SBCTA requires complete streets within San Bernardino County when cities apply for roadway expansion grants.

References

Public transportation in California
Public transportation in San Bernardino County, California